The Honda CRF230L is a dual-sport motorcycle made by Honda from 2008 to 2009. It was designed to be a small, lightweight, affordable dual sport for beginner riders, commuters, or adventure riders. It was sold in the U.S and Canada.

History
The CRF230L was created as the successor to the XL185S. It was Honda's first new dual sport in 16 years since the introduction of the XR650L in 1992. It was marketed as a road legal version of the CRF230F, hence the name "CRF" instead of XR or XL as with earlier Honda dual sports, despite having a different frame and engine from Honda's other CRF formats.

References

CRF230L
Dual-sport motorcycles
Motorcycles introduced in 2008